The recording career of Russian pianist and composer Daniil Trifonov initially focused on the music of Frédéric Chopin. His first three albums, recorded in 2010 and released in 2011, exclusively consisted of works of Chopin: the first album, Daniil Trifonov plays Frédéric Chopin, consisting of music performed live in recitals in Italy, was released by Decca Records in April; his second album, Chopin: Mazurki; Konzert, containing performances from the 16th Chopin International Piano Competition in Warsaw (where he won the third prize), was released in May; and finally, his third album, Chopin, a studio recording, was released in July. Trifonov's next album, Tchaikovsky: Piano Concerto No. 1, released in 2012, included a performance of Tchaikovsky's Piano Concerto No. 1 with the Mariinsky Theatre Orchestra conducted by Valery Gergiev.

In February 2013, Trifonov signed an exclusive recording contract with Deutsche Grammophon (DG). His first album for DG, The Carnegie Recital, is a live recording of a recital he had given in Carnegie Hall that month. Other recitals and chamber music concerts were recorded at festivals such as those of Verbier and Lockenhaus, resulting in a few works, including Mieczysław Weinberg's Sonatina in a performance with Gidon Kremer, being issued on other labels courtesy of DG. Trifonov's second album for DG, Rachmaninov Variations, was devoted to music by Sergei Rachmaninoff, and included the Rhapsody on a Theme of Paganini recorded with the Philadelphia Orchestra conducted by Yannick Nézet-Séguin, the Chopin and Corelli solo piano variations, and Rachmaniana, one of his own piano compositions which he wrote during his first year as a student of the Cleveland Institute of Music in 2009–10. This album was issued mid-2015. Soon after, a double DVD with two films directed by Christopher Nupen was released. The first DVD included a documentary which featured Trifonov performing excerpts of his own Piano Concerto in E-flat minor; the other DVD featured a live recital interspersed with interviews.

Trifonov's 2016 album for DG, Transcendental, consisting of the complete piano études of Franz Liszt, was a major success. It reached the number one position in the Specialist Classical Albums Chart in the United Kingdom in October 2016, was designated one of "The Best Classical Music Recordings of 2016" by The New York Times, and won the 2018 Grammy Award for Best Classical Instrumental Solo. In 2016, Trifonov also received Gramophones Artist of the Year Award. In 2017, Trifonov released three albums with DG: an album consisting of piano trios by Rachmaninoff performed with Gidon Kremer and Giedrė Dirvanauskaitė; Chopin Evocations, an album with music written by or in homage of Chopin; and an album with chamber music by Franz Schubert performed with such artists as Anne-Sophie Mutter. Trifonov's two newest albums for DG, Destination Rachmaninov • Departure and Destination Rachmaninov • Arrival were released in 2018 and 2019 respectively; the albums comprise Rachmaninov's four piano concertos with Nézet-Séguin and the Philadelphia Orchestra, in addition to J.S. Bach's Partita for violin solo No. 3 in E major (BWV 1006) arranged for piano solo by Rachmaninoff and Trifonov's own transcriptions for piano solo of Vocalise (Op. 34 No. 14) and The Silver Sleigh Bells (first movement of The Bells, Op. 35).

Trifonov has earned considerable commercial and critical success. In addition to earning a Grammy for Transcendental, he earned Grammy nominations for Rachmaninov Variations and The Carnegie Recital. In 2016, Trifonov received the Gramophone Classical Music Awards' Artist of the Year Award. His successes also include appearances on international record chart rankings, including eight albums that have ranked on the Billboard Top Classical Album chart.

 Albums 
 Studio albums 

 Live albums 

 Compilations 

 Contributions 

 Video releases 

 References General 
 Specific'

External links 
 Daniil Trifonov at Deutsche Grammophon
 
 

Discographies of Russian artists
Discographies of classical pianists